Eusmilus ('true sabre') is a prehistoric genus of nimravid that lived in Europe during the Late Eocene to Early Oligocene epochs (37.2–28.4 mya).

Taxonomy
 
There are three valid species of Eusmilus, E. bidentatus and E. villebramarensis. Ekgmoiteptecela MacDonald, 1963 was synonymized with Eusmilus by some authors, but is actually synonymous with Hoplophoneus. The third species, E. adelos, was described in 2021, and stands as the largest species in the genus. 

One study performed in 2016 suggests that Eusmilus is a non-valid genus, and moved all North American species to Hoplophoneus.  

The discovery of E. adelos meanwhile, suggests that nimravids went along derived evolutionary pathways; conical-toothed, dirk-toothed, and scimitar-toothed, with and that their evolutionary paths split in two, leading to saber-toothed and conical-tooth forms that convergently evolved with those of true felids tens of millions of years later.

Morphology
Most Eusmilus species had a long body and were about as tall as a leopard, though the species E. adelos was similar in size to a small lion, and thus was the largest of the holplophonine nimravids, reaching the weight of nearly 111 kg Eusmilus had developed long saber teeth and looked like a saber-toothed cat, but was actually a so-called 'false saber-tooth'. Most were leopard-sized and rather long-bodied and short-legged compared to modern leopards. Some reached 2.5 metres (8 ft) long. Eusmilus had lost many other teeth, possessing only 26 instead of the 44 usually seen in carnivore mammals. Its mouth could open to an angle of 90 degrees, allowing the creature to properly use its saber teeth. Bony flanges projected from Eusmilus ' lower jaw to protect the sabers (this is also seen in the unrelated marsupial Thylacosmilus and felid Megantereon). There is fossil evidence of conflict between Eusmilus and Nimravus, another genus of nimravid.

Growth and Development 
Eusmilus cubs and adolescents have been discovered, and examinations of their skeletons indicates that their saber-teeth emerged late in life, indicating the animals were dependent on their mothers for a relatively long period. The milk teeth of Eusmilus, upon their eruption, were large enough to allow it to hunt effectively. The added advantage of these milk sabers was that because of the late growth of the permanent sabers, if the milk saber-teeth were damaged, the nimravid had a chance to grow a new set of saber-teeth, allowing it to continue hunting.

References

External links 

Nimravidae
Oligocene feliforms
Eocene carnivorans
Chattian genus extinctions
Oligocene mammals of Europe
Paleogene France
Fossils of France
Quercy Phosphorites Formation
Fossil taxa described in 1873
Prehistoric carnivoran genera